The 2010 season is the 101st season in Sport Club Internacional's existence, and their 40th in the Campeonato Brasileiro, having never been relegated from the top division. On 18 August 2010, Internacional won their second Copa Libertadores title after they defeated Guadalajara 3–2 in the second leg of the final to clinch a 5–3 aggregate win.

Transfers

In

Out

Completed loan departures

2010 Campeonato Gaúcho

Taça Fernando Carvalho

Group B standings

Quarterfinals

Semifinals

Taça Fábio Koff

Group B standings

Quarterfinals

Semifinals

Finals

Tournament Finals

2010 Copa Libertadores

Second stage

Table

Round of 16

Internacional 3–3 Banfield on points. Internacional advanced on away goals.

Quarterfinals

Estudiantes 3–3 Internacional on points. Internacional advanced on away goals.

Semifinals

São Paulo 3–3 Internacional on points. Internacional advanced on away goals.

Finals

Internacional won the Copa Libertadores on points 6–0.

2010 Campeonato Brasileiro

Table

Fifa Club World Cup

Semifinals

References 

Sport Club Internacional seasons
Inter